Yeonsinnae station  is a station on Seoul Subway Line 3 and Seoul Subway Line 6, on the northwest side of Seoul in the urban area of Eunpyeong-gu. Although Yeonsinnae Station had a corresponding hanja name (延新內), this name was deemed incorrect and dropped in May 2001.

The station is located on the one-way Eungam Loop of Line 6, and therefore the trains from the Line 6 Yeonsinnae station only run in the direction of Bonghwasan station.

Platform 3 is an island-style platform with two front and one front. Platform 6 is an open-line platform with one front-side platforms. Screen doors are installed at both stations. There are seven exits.

Station layout

Transfer

It is appropriate to use Yeonsin Station when transferring to Line 3 → Line 6 or Line 6 → Line 3 (passengers departing from Dokbawi Station only).

Gallery

References

Metro stations in Eunpyeong District
Seoul Metropolitan Subway stations
Railway stations in South Korea opened in 1985
Seoul Subway Line 3
Seoul Subway Line 6